Sten Werner Osther (born 14 March 1948) is a retired Norwegian handball player who competed in the 1972 Summer Olympics.

He was born in Fredrikstad and represented the club Bækkelagets SK. In 1972 he was part of the Norwegian team which finished ninth in the Olympic tournament. He played three matches and scored six goals.

References

1948 births
Living people
Norwegian male handball players
Olympic handball players of Norway
Handball players at the 1972 Summer Olympics
Sportspeople from Fredrikstad